Toronto Hebrew Memorial Parks operates two Jewish cemeteries in York Region. THMP is based in Toronto at the Prosserman Jewish Community Centre.

The majority of Jewish burial sites in the Greater Toronto Area are in Toronto (6) and many Jewish residents are now living further north in Toronto and in York Region.

Pardes Shalom Cemetery

Pardes Shalom opened in 1977 and is a resting place for over 30,000 on an  site in Maple, Ontario.

Pardes Chaim Cemetery

Pardes Chaim opened in 2010 in Maple. The newer site offers 70,000 plots over 200 acres.

References

Jewish cemeteries in Ontario